Lachlin (Lachlan) McCallum (March 15, 1823 – January 13, 1903) was a Canadian politician.

McCallum, born in Tiree, Argyllshire, Scotland, was a contractor and shipowner before entering politics as a Liberal-Conservative. He represented the riding of Monck in the House of Commons of Canada from 1867 to 1872, when he was defeated by James David Edgar. However, in 1874, McCallum defeated Edgar by a margin of just 34 votes, and was returned to Parliament.

Due to the closeness of the result, McCallum was unseated on May 12, 1875. In the subsequent byelection, McCallum again defeated Edgar, this time by a mere 4 votes.

McCallum was an unsuccessful candidate for a seat in assembly for the Province of Canada in 1863. He was also a member of the Legislative Assembly of Ontario having been elected in the 1871 election in the riding of Monck. He was a member of the Ontario Conservative Party.

He served as reeve for the United Townships of Sherbrooke and Moulton in Ontario.

McCallum remained in the House until 1887, when he was appointed to the Senate; he served in the Senate until his death at the age of 79.

McCallum was the founder and Naval Captain (Colonel) of the Dunnville Naval Brigade 1861–1866. During the Fenian Raid he commanded the 'war tug' W.T. Robb and fought with his men against the Fenians in Fort Erie on the afternoon of June 2. Outnumbered 10 to 1, McCallum and sixteen other men fought their way out of Fort Erie before being rescued by the Robb.

McCallum lived in Stromness, Ontario. In 1854, he married Priscilla Dawson Thewliss. He died in office in Stromness in 1903.

References

External links

1823 births
1903 deaths
Canadian senators from Ontario
Conservative Party of Canada (1867–1942) MPs
Conservative Party of Canada (1867–1942) senators
Members of the House of Commons of Canada from Ontario
Progressive Conservative Party of Ontario MPPs
Scottish emigrants to pre-Confederation Ontario